Miss World Philippines is the annual pageant that selects representative of the Philippines to Miss World pageant.

History
The pageant was conceived on January 25, 2011 when the franchise that was previously held by Binibining Pilipinas Charities, Inc. was awarded by Julia Morley, Chair and CEO of Miss World Limited, to Cory Quirino, who served as the exclusive licensee and national director for the Philippines from 2011 to 2016. The pageant was officially launched on March 23, 2011 at the SMDC Showroom at the SM Mall of Asia.

Quirino resigned as the national director on January 15, 2017, due to personal and business reasons. A day later, Arnold Vegafria, who served as the talent manager of Miss World 2013 Megan Young, took over the position after he met with Morley. Under Vegafria's term, three additional minor international beauty pageant titles are awarded namely: Miss Eco Philippines, and Miss Multinational Philippines, Reina Hispanoamericana - Filipinas, Miss Tourism Philippines, and Miss Eco Teen Philippines for which they will represent the Philippines internationally.

Prior to Miss World Philippines, the title was awarded through the Miss Republic of the Philippines pageant from 1966 to 1996, then by Mutya ng Pilipinas, Inc. through Mutya ng Pilipinas pageant from 1977 to 1991, and Binibining Pilipinas Charities, Inc. through the Binibining Pilipinas pageant from 1992 to 2010. See Philippines at major beauty pageants.

Titleholders

International placements

Current franchises
Color keys

Miss World 
2011–Present
{| class="wikitable sortable" style="font-size: 95%; text-align:left"
!width="30" |Year
!width="250" |
!width="200" |Placement
!width="310" |Special award(s)
!Ref.
|-style="background-color:#FFF83B;
| 2011
| Gwendoline Gaelle Sandrine Ruais
| 1st Runner-Up
| style="background:#FFF83B;" |
 Continental Queen of Beauty (Miss World Asia) 
 Top 10 in Top Model
 Top 30 in Beauty with a Purpose
 Top 30 in Beach Beauty
|
|-style="background-color:#ffff99;"
| 2012
| Queenierich Rehman
| Top 15
| style="background:#ffff99;" | 
 World Fashion Designer Award
 Top 5 in Talent
 Top 40 in Beach Beauty
 Top 46 in Top Model
|
|-style="background-color:gold; font-weight: bold"
| 2013
| Megan Lynne Young
| Miss World 2013
| style="background:gold;" | 
 Top Model Winner
 Continental Queen of Beauty (Miss World Asia)
 3rd Runner-Up in Multimedia
 4th Runner-Up in Beach Beauty
 Top 10 in Beauty with a Purpose
 ' Dances of the World Performer
|
|-style="background-color:#FFFACD"
| 2014
| Valerie Weigmann
| Top 25
| style="background:#FFFACD;" |
 Top 10 in Beauty with a Purpose
 Top 10 in People's Choice Award
|
|-style="background-color:#ffff99;"
| 2015
| Hillarie Danielle Parungao
| Top 10
| style="background:#ffff99;" | 
 Multimedia Winner
 9th Place in Interview
 Top 10 in People's Choice Award
|
|-style="background-color:#FFF83B;
| 2016
| Catriona Elisa Gray
| Top 5
| style="background:#FFF83B;" |
 Multimedia Winner
 Top 5 in Beauty with a Purpose
 Top 10 in Talent
|
|-style="background-color:#FFFACD"
| 2017
| Laura Victoria Lehmann
| Top 40
| style="background:#FFFACD;" |
 Beauty with a Purpose Winner
 Head-to-Head Challenge Winner
 Top 10 in People's Choice Award
|
|-style="background-color:white"
| 2018
| Katarina Sonja Rodriguez
| 
| style="background-color:white";" | 
 Head-to-Head Challenge Winner (Round 1)
 Top 32 in Top Model
 Top 10 in People's Choice Award
|
|-style="background-color:#ffff99;"
| 2019
| Michelle Daniela Dee
| Top 12
| style="background:#ffff99";" | 
 Head-to-Head Challenge Winner (Rounds 1 and 2)
 Top 20 in Beauty with a Purpose
 Top 40 in Top Model
|
|-
| 
| colspan="5" 
|-style="background-color:#FFFF99;
| 2021
| Tracy Maureen Perez
| Top 13
| 
 Head-to-Head Challenge Winner (Rounds 1 and 2)
 Beauty with a Purpose Winner
|
|-
| 
| colspan="5" 
|-
|2023
|Gwendolyne Fourniol 
| TBA
| TBA
|
|}

 Miss Supranational 2021–2022 Miss Eco International 2017–Present Reina Hispanoamericana 2017–Present Miss Eco Teen International 2019–Present Miss Tourism World 2022–PresentFormer franchises

 Miss Multinational 2017–2021 Miss Tourism 2019–2021 Miss Environment International 2021-2022''

References

External links
 Official website

 
Philippines
Philippines
Philippines
Recurring events established in 2011
2011 establishments in the Philippines